Fawzia or Faouzia or Fouzia is an Arabic personal name. Notable people named Fawzia or alternative spellings include:

Fawzia
Fawzia Yusuf H. Adam, Somali politician, former Minister of Foreign Affairs and former Deputy Prime Minister of Somalia
Fawzia Assaad (born 1929), Egyptian novelist writing in French
Fawzia Fahim, Egyptian scientist biochemist and environmental biologist
Fawzia Afzal-Khan, Pakistani-American academic
Princess Fawzia of Egypt (disambiguation), various members of Egyptian royalty
Princess Fawzia Fuad of Egypt (1921-2013), daughter of King Fuad I of Egypt, and first wife of Mohammad Reza Pahlavi, Shah of Iran
Princess Fawzia Farouk of Egypt (1940–2005), daughter of King Farouk of Egypt
Princess Fawzia-Latifa of Egypt (born 12 February 1982), daughter of King Fuad II of Egypt
Fawzia Koofi (born 1975), Afghan politician and women's rights activist
Fawzia Mohamed, Egyptian model
Fawzia Mirza, Pakistani-American actress
Fawzia Peer, South African politician
Fawzia Rhoda, South African politician
Fawzia Zainal, Bahraini politician, Speaker of the Council of Representatives, media and social activist
Fawzia Zouari (born 1955), Tunisian writer and journalist

Faouzia
Faouzia, full name Faouzia Ouihya (born 2000), Moroccan-Canadian singer-songwriter and musician
Faouzia Aloui (born 1957), Tunisian poet and fiction writer
Faouzia Charfi née Rekik (born 1941), Tunisian scientist, intellectual and politician
Faouzia Mebarki (born 1959), Algerian diplomat, ambassador to Austria and Slovakia

Fouzia
Fouzia El Bayed also Elbayed, Moroccan women's rights advocate, a former member of the Moroccan Parliament 
Fouzia Bhatti (born 1979), Pakistani Urdu language author, poet, and columnist
Fouzia Habib, Pakistani politician
Fouzia Hameed, Pakistani politician 
Fouzia Khan, also known as Fauzia Khan, Indian politician
Fouzia Ejaz Khan, Pakistani politician 
Fouzia Rhissassi (born 1947), Moroccan academician, professor of social sciences
Fouzia Saeed (born 1959), Pakistani social activist, gender expert, trainer/facilitator, development manager, folk culture promoter, television commentator

Fowziyo
 Fowsiyo Yusuf Haji Adan, Somali politician

See also
Fawzi